Timothy Ray Goad (born February 28, 1966) is a former American football defensive tackle.  He attended high school at Patrick County High School in Stuart, VA and was a member of the Cougar varsity football team.  He played offensive tackle and defensive tackle for the team.  After high school, he attended the University of North Carolina in Chapel Hill, where he played on the defensive line.  After college, Goad was drafted by the New England Patriots.  He made his first professional appearance on September 4, 1988 in a 28–3 Patriots' victory. He played seven seasons in New England.  In 1995, he played for the Cleveland Browns, and finished his career with the Baltimore Ravens in 1996. In 1998, Goad became the jackman for the NASCAR team Wood Brothers Racing, while also serving at Petty Enterprises and Kevin Harvick Incorporated, the latter in which he served as pit coach. He also worked as a professional bass fisherman.  He currently resides in Pittsboro, NC C.I.D..

References

1966 births
Living people
People from Patrick County, Virginia
American football defensive tackles
North Carolina Tar Heels football players
New England Patriots players
Cleveland Browns players
Baltimore Ravens players
Players of American football from Virginia
Ed Block Courage Award recipients